Megan Hyatt (born July 28, 1990 in Lake Forest, Illinois) is an American figure skater. She is the 2006 US national junior champion. She placed 13th at the 2006 World Junior Championships and won a silver medal at the 2006 ISU Junior Grand Prix in France.

Programs

Competitive highlights

References

External links
 
 

1990 births
Living people
American female single skaters
Sportspeople from Lake Forest, Illinois